The K808/806 White Tiger  ( "Baekho", Hanja: 白虎) wheeled armored personnel carrier is family of 8x8 and 6x6  armored vehicles. Developed by Hyundai Rotem as a private venture in 2012, the Korean Army declared a plan to acquire 600 6×6 and 8×8 wheeled APCs in order to help build rapid response forces molded after U.S. Stryker combat brigades, according to the Defense Acquisition Program Administration (DAPA). Hyundai Rotem, a (subsidiary  of Hyundai Motor Group), made the K808/806 in competition with the Doosan Black Fox and Samsung Techwin MPV, and eventually won the competition.

Development
On 9 May 2016, the vehicles, officially designated as the K808 and K806, passed their final qualification tests, allowing for production to begin for deployment the next year; 600 units are to be produced by 2023.  The wheeled vehicles were created to enhance the mobility and striking power of infantry over the slower K200 and K21 tracked vehicles, with the K808 designed for fast troop deployment and reconnaissance missions in front-line areas while the K806 is intended for mobile strike and reconnaissance missions in the rear.  Their wheeled designs make them better suited for contributing to United Nations peacekeeping operations and finding export markets.

Hyundai Rotem expected an order by October 2016 for 16 low-rate initial production vehicles to be delivered to the ROKA for field trials, scheduled to last until late 2017.  Production would then commence in 2018 at a rate of 100 per year.  Out of 600 total wheeled armored vehicles (WAVs), there would be 100 K806 and 500 K808, designated K806 and K808 in ROKA service, respectively. Although the two variants share many performance characteristics, they have different concepts of operations: the 16-tonne (17.6-ton) K806 can perform rear-echelon roles such as facility defence and logistics convoy protection, while the 20-tonne (22-ton) K808 can conduct high-intensity combat operations alongside K1A1 and K2 main battle tanks.

In September 2018, the Defense Acquisition Program Administration announced Hyundai Rotem would begin mass-producing the K806 and K808 vehicles later in the year.

Design

The engine is located in the front on the left side, while the driver sits beside the engine to the right.  The troop compartment is at the rear, accommodating 10 fully equipped soldiers plus 2 crew members.  Troops enter and exit the vehicle via a rear automatic ramp in addition to 4 roof hatches.

Protection
The K808/806 has an all-welded armored hull that provides protection against small-arms fire and artillery shell splinters. It can be fitted with add-on armor for a higher level of protection. It is also equipped with the NBC protection system. The 8×8 version is more heavily armored than the 6×6 version.

Engine
Initially, the K808/806 Scorpion was fitted with a Hyundai diesel engine developing 380 hp, but later this engine was replaced with another Hyundai engine developing 420 hp with a 7-speed transmission and 2-mode secondary transmission. This engine is used in 8×8 configuration. The vehicle has an automatic drive-line management system, central tire inflation system, and run-flat tires. The Scorpion 8×8 is fully amphibious, propelled by two water jets, but the Scorpion 6×6 is not.

Weapons
The vehicle is provided with a remotely controlled weapon station armed with a 40 mm automatic grenade launcher or 12.7 mm machine gun. It can also support a two-man turret, armed with a 30 mm cannon and coaxial 7.62 mm machine gun. It can also feature a manned weapon station with a 40 mm grenade launcher and 7.62 mm machine gun. In Korean service, the K806/K808 will be outfitted with a one-person protected weapon station armed with an M2HB machine gun rather than an RWS, to reduce acquisition costs, although the company could supply such systems if requested.

In June 2020, Hanwha Defense was given a contract to deliver the 30 mm Anti-Aircraft Gun-Wheeled Vehicle System (AAGW) to the ROK military, a K808 chassis fitted with the twin 30 mm cannon turret of the K30 Biho. It has greater range than the Vulcan Air Defense System (VADS) it will replace. Deployment began in December 2021 and will continue until the early 2030s.

Variants
 KW1 medical evacuation vehicle (MEV), based on the 6×6 chassis.
 KW1 Armored Combat Vehicle (ACV), based on the 6×6 chassis.
 KW1 Mobile Gun System (MGS), armed with 90 mm gun, based on the 6×6 chassis.
 KW2 8×8 armored personnel carrier (APC), based on the 6×6 chassis.
 KW2 Jupiter 8×8 fire support vehicle, armed with a 120 mm gun, based on the 8×8 chassis.
 KW2 30 mm self-propelled anti-aircraft gun, based on the 8×8 chassis.
 KW2 120 mm mortar carrier, based on the 8×8 chassis.
 KW2 Command Post, based on the 8×8 chassis.
 KW2 Anti-Tank Vehicle, features RWS with 30 mm cannon and two Raybolt ATGMs, based on the 8×8 chassis.

See also

Comparable vehicles

 Stryker
 LAV III/LAV AFV/LAV-25/ASLAV
 Tusan AFV
 Boxer
 Freccia IFV
 BTR-90
 VPK-7829 Bumerang
 ZBL-08
 CM-32
 Type 96 Armored Personnel Carrier
 Type 16 maneuver combat vehicle
 Patria AMV
 BTR-4
 Saur 2
 VBCI
 KTO Rosomak
 FNSS Pars
 MOWAG Piranha
 Terrex ICV

References

Wheeled armoured personnel carriers
Hyundai Motor Group
Armoured fighting vehicles of South Korea
Six-wheeled vehicles
Military vehicles introduced in the 2010s
Wheeled amphibious armoured fighting vehicles
Armoured personnel carriers of South Korea